Carrilho is a surname. Notable people with the surname include:

Altamiro Carrilho (1924–2012), Brazilian musician and composer
António José Cavaco Carrilho (born 1942), Portuguese Roman Catholic bishop
Júlio Eduardo Zamith Carrilho (1946–2021), Mozambican politician 
Luís Carrilho, Portuguese United Nations official
Manuel Maria Carrilho (born 1951), Portuguese academic and politician
Mirano Carrilho (born 1975), Dutch football player

Portuguese-language surnames